Gal Koren (born January 16, 1992) is a retired Slovenian professional ice hockey player.

Koren competed at the 2013 IIHF World Championship as a member of the Slovenia men's national ice hockey team.

References

External links

1992 births
Living people
People from Domžale
Kelowna Rockets players
KHL Medveščak Zagreb players
HDD Olimpija Ljubljana players
Manchester Storm (2015–) players
Slovenian ice hockey centres
Slovenian expatriate sportspeople in the Czech Republic
Slovenian expatriate sportspeople in Germany
Slovenian expatriate sportspeople in Canada
Slovenian expatriate sportspeople in Croatia
Slovenian expatriate sportspeople in Slovakia
Slovenian expatriate sportspeople in England